Australian labour law concerns Commonwealth, state, and common law on rights and duties of workers, unions and employers in Australia. Australian labour law (also known as industrial relations law) has a dual structure, where some employment issues and relationships are governed by Commonwealth (the Australian federal government) laws, and others are governed by state and territory laws or the common law. It shares a heritage with laws across the Commonwealth of Nations, UK labour law and standards set by the International Labour Organization, the Australian legislature and courts have a built a comprehensive charter of rights at work.

Constitutional basis
The conciliation and arbitration power of the Commonwealth was originally based on Section 51(xxxv) of the Constitution of Australia, which provides:
"The [Commonwealth] Parliament shall, subject to this Constitution, have power to make laws for the peace, order, and good government of the Commonwealth with respect to: 
(xxxv) conciliation and arbitration for the prevention and settlement of industrial disputes extending beyond the limits of any one state".

The Commonwealth's power to make laws about labour law under the conciliation and arbitration power was seen as being extremely narrow and limited. The Commonwealth government sought to widen its industrial powers by other means. For example, in 1906 two bills were introduced that would become the Customs Tariff Act 1906, and the Excise Tariff Act 1906 which exempted manufacturers who paid "fair and reasonable" wages to their employees from these duties. The Commonwealth Court of Conciliation and Arbitration in the Harvester case (1907) was required to determine what were "fair and reasonable" wages, but the High Court of Australia in R v Barger (1908) struck down the government's strategy of using the taxation power to enact labour laws as invalid. The Barger decision was made in the context of the then prevailing reserved State powers doctrine, which was itself overturned in 1920 in the Engineers case.

Since 2005, Australian industrial relations laws, such as WorkChoices, have been primarily based on the corporations power in section 51(xx) of the Constitution, which enables labour laws to be of much wider reach, without the constraints imposed by the conciliation and arbitration power. The corporations power gives the federal parliament power to make laws with respect to "trading and financial corporations formed within the limits of the Commonwealth", as well as 'foreign' corporations.

History

Commonwealth Court of Conciliation and Arbitration

The Commonwealth passed the Commonwealth Conciliation and Arbitration Act 1904, based on conciliation and arbitration power, which sought to introduce the rule of law in industrial relations in Australia and, besides other things, established the Commonwealth Court of Conciliation and Arbitration, whose functions included the hearing and arbitration of industrial disputes, and to make awards. It also had judicial functions of interpreting and enforcing awards and hearing other criminal and civil cases relating to industrial relations law. The Act originally applied to industrial disputes "extending beyond the limits of any one State, including disputes in relation to employment upon State railways, or to employment in industries carried on by or under the control of the Commonwealth or a State or any public authority constituted under the Commonwealth or a State". Andrew Fisher amended the 1904 Act to provide greater authority for the court president and to allow Commonwealth employees' industrial unions to register.

In disputes involving a company in a single state either a union or industrial organisation will rope them into a federal award by arguing that they are part of an industry in which a dispute extending beyond the limits of any one state exist. (This can be done by finding another company which did similar work and serving them with a log of claims concurrently or by virtue of a company's membership of a peak industry body.) Alternatively, if the company was not covered by a federal Award it would be covered by the various States' industrial relations systems, and disputes are conciliated or arbitrated by the state industrial relations commissions which would create an industry rule Award.

Commonwealth Conciliation and Arbitration Commission

In 1956, the High Court in the Boilermakers' case held that the Commonwealth Court of Conciliation and Arbitration, as a tribunal exercising the non-judicial power of arbitration, could not also exercise judicial power as a Chapter III Court. The court was abolished in 1956 and was replaced by two new bodies. The Commonwealth Industrial Court was created to exercise the court's judicial powers. In 1973, it was renamed the Australian Industrial Court, and in 1977 its functions were transferred to the new Federal Court of Australia.

The Commonwealth Conciliation and Arbitration Commission was also created in 1956 to carry out the non-judicial functions of the previous Court. In 1973, it was renamed the Australian Conciliation and Arbitration Commission, and replaced by the Australian Industrial Relations Commission in 1988. The wage fixing function of the Australian Industrial Relations Commission was removed and given to the newly created Australian Fair Pay Commission in 2006 as part of the WorkChoices amendments.  Both the Australian Industrial Relations Commission and the Australian Fair Pay Commission were dissolved in 2009, to be succeeded by Fair Work Australia in 2010, and renamed the Fair Work Commission in 2012.

Industrial Relations Act 1988
The 1904 Act was amended many times before being repealed by the Industrial Relations (Consequential Provisions) Act 1988 with effect on 1 March 1989, and superseded by the Industrial Relations Act 1988. The Industrial Relations Act 1988 was amended by the Industrial Relations Reform Act 1993, which adopted a decentralised labour law model with support for collective bargaining, rather than the centralised wage-fixing model adopted since the 1970s and formalised under the Prices and Incomes Accord between the Hawke Labor government and the Australian Council of Trade Unions.

Workplace Relations Act 1996: WorkChoices

In 1996, the Howard Government passed the Workplace Relations Act 1996, which replaced the Hawke Government's Industrial Relations Act 1988, with effect on 1 January 1997. The 1996 Act was substantially amended by the Workplace Relations Amendment (Work Choices) Act 2005, (aka Work Choices Act 2005) which came into effect on 27 March 2006, introducing WorkChoices.

The 2005 Act used the corporations power to override state systems and unify industrial relations systems under a federal umbrella. In modern Australia, where the corporation is almost ubiquitous in business, that effectively meant the corporations power could be used to make laws about almost all employment relationships. As a consequence, WorkChoices had effective control of 85% of the employees in the Australian workforce. The changes created a separate Australian Fair Pay Commission to set wages, and enhanced powers for the Office of the Employment Advocate and a corresponding lesser role for the Australian Industrial Relations Commission.

The constitutional validity of the WorkChoices legislation was challenged in the High Court in New South Wales v Commonwealth. The Court decided by a majority of 5–2 in November 2006 that all the WorkChoices reforms were valid. This was a landmark decision in Australian constitutional law and in Australian federal-state relations, confirming that the width of the scope of the Commonwealth's power in relation to corporations.

A 2008 amendment to WorkChoices further expanded the federal government's reach into employer-employee relations when it prohibited awards which were determined by reference to state or territory boundaries or did not have effect in each state and territory.

Fair Work Act 2009

The Rudd Labor Government's Fair Work Act 2009 ("An Act relating to workplace relations, and for related purposes") (FW Act) repealed the Workplace Relations Amendment (Work Choices) Act 2005, and established Fair Work Australia (renamed Fair Work Commission in 2012), which commenced operation on 1 July 2009. The Fair Work Act 2009 created Fair Work Australia, now the Fair Work Commission, and is still in force .

The Fair Work (Registered Organisations) Act 2009 ("An Act relating to registered organisations, and for other purposes") superseded the  Workplace Relations Act 1996 (the successor to Industrial Relations Act 1988), and is still in force .

The Fair Work Commission's functions include the setting and varying industrial awards, minimum wage fixation, dispute resolution, the approval of enterprise agreements, and handling claims for unfair dismissal.

States
The Victorian Government has referred most of its industrial relations powers to the Commonwealth, most recently via the Fair Work (Commonwealth Powers) Act 2009 (Vic), resulting in a majority of public sector workers in Victoria being covered by the FW Act.

See also
 Electrolux v AWU (2004)
 Hancock Report (1985)
 Harvester case (1907)
History of labour law
 History of the minimum wage#Australia
 Patrick Stevedores v MUA (1998)
 White Paper on Full Employment in Australia (1945) – defined economic policy for 30 years

Notes

References

Further reading
 (In 1996, Victoria referred the bulk of its industrial powers to the Commonwealth.)

 
Labour law by country